Chartham railway station is in Chartham, Kent, on the Ashford to Ramsgate line. The station, and all trains serving it, is operated by Southeastern.

Facilities
The station is to the north of Chartham village and south of the A28 road which runs parallel from Ashford to Canterbury. It is unstaffed, but has electronic indicator boards and a ticket machine. There are two platforms, connected by a footbridge. A level crossing at the south end of the station, by the signal box, was formerly manually operated but was replaced with automated crossing gates in December 2022.

History
The station was opened by the South Eastern Railway (SER) in September 1850, some time after the line from Ashford to Canterbury was completed. In common with several other stations on the line, there was a level crossing as the SER did not believe the line would attract sufficient traffic for bridges.

Goods services were withdrawn from the station on 19 November 1962.

Incidents 
At around 06:45 on 9 October 1894, a wagon of hop-pickers on their way to work at Horton Chapel Farm was struck by the delayed 04:15 down Ashford to  goods train. Canterbury West goods train. Five hop-pickers were killed instantly, with a further two dying from their injuries later. The investigation found that the wagon driver had left the opening of the gates to children in poor visibility, and had failed to stop before crossing. The train crew whistled at least three times while approaching the crossing. The inspecting officer, Charles Scrope Hutchinson, criticised the South Eastern Railway for the excessively long rostered hours of the train crew. Ultimately, blame was assigned to the wagon driver and the SER was exonerated.

Services

All services at Chartham are operated by Southeastern using  EMUs.

The typical off-peak service in trains per hour is:
 1 tph to London Charing Cross via 
 1 tph to 

During the peak hours, the station is also served by trains to London Cannon Street.

The station is also served by a single early morning service to London St Pancras International, operated by a  EMU.

References
Notes

Citations

Sources

External links

City of Canterbury
Railway stations in Kent
DfT Category F2 stations
Former South Eastern Railway (UK) stations
Railway stations in Great Britain opened in 1850
Railway stations served by Southeastern
1859 establishments in England